Gymnoscelis crassata is a moth in the family Geometridae. It was described by William Warren in 1901. It is found on São Tomé, Ghana, Ivory Coast, Nigeria, Sierra Leone and Tanzania.

Subspecies
Gymnoscelis crassata crassata
Gymnoscelis crassata varians Prout, 1937

References

Moths described in 1901
crassata
Insects of West Africa
Insects of São Tomé and Príncipe
Insects of Tanzania
Moths of Africa